TMAS may refer to:
 Maritime Telemedical Assistance Service
 Taylor Manifest Anxiety Scale

See also 
 TMA (disambiguation)